Denislav Andreev  (born 12 September 1983) is a Bulgarian former footballer, who plays as a midfielder for Septemvri Tervel.

References

1983 births
Living people
Bulgarian footballers
First Professional Football League (Bulgaria) players
Second Professional Football League (Bulgaria) players
PFC Spartak Varna players
Association football midfielders